Michael Powell Siddons (born 1928)  was Wales Herald of Arms Extraordinary. He was appointed in November 1994, following the death of Francis Jones and retired 30 June 2010. In addition to the publications listed below, he has authored numerous articles on heraldic and genealogical subjects. Siddons also serves as the president of the Cardiganshire Family History Society.

Publications
Michael Powell Siddons. The Development of Welsh Heraldry. (Aberystwyth, Cardiff: 1991–1993). 
Michael Powell Siddons. Visitations by the Heralds in Wales. (The Harleian Society, London: 1996).
Michael Powell Siddons. The Visitation of Herefordshire 1634. (The Harleian Society, London: 2002).
Michael Powell Siddons. Welsh Pedigree Rolls. (National Library of Wales, Cardiff: 1996).

Arms

See also
Heraldry
Herald

External links

The College of Arms
CUHAGS Officer of Arms Index

1928 births
English officers of arms
Living people
Welsh genealogists
Fellows of the Society of Genealogists